The Bras d'Or Yacht Club is a yacht club in Baddeck, Nova Scotia. It is located on its namesake body of water, the Bras d'Or Lakes. The club was founded in 1904. Among its founding members were Gilbert Hovey Grosvenor, H. Percy Blanchard and Arthur Williams McCurdy. The clubhouse was constructed in 1913. Longtime member J.A. McCurdy, while serving as Lieutenant Governor of Nova Scotia, donated the McCurdy Cup to the club. This cup serves as the club championship. Alexander Graham Bell frequently attended club functions and even composed a song about it.

Notable events
Regatta Week -- Annual event since 1913
Canadian Snipe Championships -- 1954, 1965
OK Dinghy Championships -- 1977
National Laser Open -- 1979
National Laser Open Women -- 1982
Hobie Nationals -- 1987, 1992

Notable members
Gilbert Hovey Grosvenor
Arthur Williams McCurdy
H. Percy Blanchard
J.A. McCurdy
Casey Baldwin
Thomas Selfridge
Mabel Bell

References

Yacht clubs in Canada
Organizations based in Nova Scotia